Burnt Island or Burnt Islands may refer to:

Canada
 Burnt Island, Ontario, community on Manitoulin Island in Lake Huron
 Burnt Islands, Newfoundland and Labrador, community on the island of Newfoundland, Canada

United Kingdom
 Burnt Island, Bermuda, located in Paget Parish
 Burnt Island, Isles of Scilly, Cornwall
 Burnt Islands, group of three islands in the Kyles of Bute, Scotland

See also
 Burntisland, town in Fife, Scotland
 Burnt Island Tickle, Newfoundland and Labrador, settlement in Canada